ELAM 5 Combate Ceja del Negro is a Cuban polyclinic and Medical Science facility located in the municipality of Sandino, Pinar del Río Province.

The school is one of several faculties of its kind falling under the jurisdiction of the Cuban-Venezuelan initiative, as well as a new program to create more Latin American doctors.

ELAM 5 presently has approximately 390 students from Guyana. Most of the students were received on November 22-23, 2006. In September of 2008, another group of approximately 100 Guyanese students who did their premed studies at ELAM 10 Rafael Ferro Macias arrived. 

The faculty is known for having one of the highest grade point averages in Sandino.

Campus 
This campus is located just on the outskirts of the town of Sandino, and is notably surrounded by an orange orchard.

The school consists of three buildings, the first of which contains classrooms and administrative sectors. The largest building contains dormitories, a laundromat, a theater, a laboratory, and a polyclinic. The smallest building houses the mess hall and food storage facilities.

The campus is designed to accommodate around 450 students. There are recreational facilities on the campus as well, including a plaza, volleyball courts. basketball courts, and a soccer field.

Accommodations

Curriculum 
The ELAM project is aimed at creating medical professionals of the highest caliber, and thus centers its focus on rigorous tutoring.  
This new program differs from the conventional teaching of medical sciences as separated subjects, but instead applies an integrated approach to medicine, offering subjects like Human Morphology and Physiology.
All subjects are taught in Spanish and have weekly content orientations and evaluations, followed by an end of course examination. Students who do not meet the required grade after the final examinations are required to take another examination two weeks later.  
The medical program lasts 6 years with a final year internship, with the new school year beginning every September and ending around July-August.

Culture, Religion and Leisure 

On entering the campus, one can immediately begin to feel that distinct culture which defines Guyanese society, with its rich blend stemming from the six race populous of Guyana. Moreover, the students at ELAM 5 have learned to appreciate the differences that are part of Cuban culture, and have successfully incorporated a lot of the local customs and culture into their daily routine.  From the use of particular local phrases to a dancing casino (dance endemic to Cuba) the students have further enriched their unique culture.

See also
ELAM 10 Rafael Ferro Macias
Sandino, Cuba
Latin American School of Medicine (Cuba)

References

Medical schools in Cuba
Sandino, Cuba